The Labour Court in Belgium is a court which deals in first instance with disputes between employers and employees and disputes regarding social security. There is a Labour Court in each Judicial Arrondissement of Belgium. It is not a division of the Court of First Instance. The decisions of the Labour Court can be appealed against to the Court of Labour.

References

Belgian labour law
Judiciary of Belgium
Labour courts
Courts in Belgium